Ischyropsalis is a genus of harvestmen in the family Ischyropsalididae, found in Europe. There are more than 20 described species in Ischyropsalis.

Description
Species in this genus range in body length from about four to 8.5 mm. They have moderately long legs. The greatly enlarged chelicerae can be almost twice as long as the body. While they share this feature with the Nipponopsalididae, this is a case of convergent evolution. The elongated pedipalps are rather slender. Some species occur in caves.

Distribution
Members of this genus are restricted to Europe, with many species found in the mountains (Pyrenees, Alps, Carpathian Mountains, and Dinaric Mountains). They reach into the Netherlands, northwestern Germany and Poland in the north and to Calabria in the south. A find from Sardinia is considered doubtful.

Name
The genus name is a combination of Ancient Greek ischyros "strong" and psalis "shears", referring to the greatly enlarged chelicerae.

Species
These 21 species belong to the genus Ischyropsalis:

 Ischyropsalis adamii Canestrini, 1873
 Ischyropsalis cantabrica Luque & Labrada, 2012
 Ischyropsalis carli Lessert, 1905
 Ischyropsalis dentipalpis Canestrini, 1872
 Ischyropsalis dispar Simon, 1872
 Ischyropsalis gigantea Dresco, 1968
 Ischyropsalis hadzii Roewer, 1950
 Ischyropsalis hellwigi (Panzer, 1794)
 Ischyropsalis hispanica Roewer, 1953
 Ischyropsalis kollari C.L.Koch, 1839
 Ischyropsalis lithoclasica Schönhofer & Martens, 2010
 Ischyropsalis luteipes Simon, 1872
 Ischyropsalis magdalenae Simon, 1881
 Ischyropsalis manicata C.L.Koch, 1865
 Ischyropsalis muellneri Hamann, 1898
 Ischyropsalis navarrensis Roewer, 1950
 Ischyropsalis nodifera Simon, 1879
 Ischyropsalis noltei Dresco, 1972
 Ischyropsalis petiginosa Simon, 1913
 Ischyropsalis pyrenaea Simon, 1872
 Ischyropsalis ravasinii Hadzi, 1942
 Ischyropsalis robusta Simon, 1872
 Ischyropsalis strandi Kratochvil, 1936

Taxonomic synonyms
The following were determined to be synonyms of the above species and are no longer valid.

 I. alfkeni Roewer, 1950, synonym of I. muellneri
 I. amseli Roewer, 1950, synonym of I. adamii
 I. archeri Roewer, 1950, synonym of I. dispar
 I. asturica Roewer, 1950, synonym of I. nodifera
 I. austriaca Roewer, 1950, synonym of I. manicata
 I. balcanica Roewer, 1950, synonym of I. manicata
 I. bosnica Roewer, 1914, synonym of I. kollari
 I. caporiaccoi Roewer, 1950, synonym of I. luteipes
 I. corcyraea Roewer, 1914, synonym of I. muellneri
 I. corsica Roewer, 1950, synonym of I. nodifera
 I. dacica Roewer, 1916, synonym of I. manicata
 I. danubia Roewer, 1950, synonym of I. kollari
 I. franzi Roewer, 1950, synonym of I. hellwigii
 I. goodnighti Roewer, 1950, synonym of I. dispar
 I. helvetica Roewer, 1916, synonym of I. dentipalpis, I. manicata
 I. janetscheki Roewer, 1950, synonym of I. nodifera
 I. kastneri Roewer, 1950, synonym of I. manicata
 I. knirschi Roewer, 1950, synonym of I. strandi
 I. kratochvili Roewer, 1950, synonym of I. adamii
 I. lusitanica Roewer, 1923, synonym of I. robusta
 I. moreana Roewer, 1950, synonym of I. nodifera, I. pyrenaea
 I. nicaea Roewer, 1950, synonym of I. navarrensis
 I. nivalis Roewer, 1950, synonym of I. kollari
 I. pentelica Roewer, 1950, synonym of I. carli
 I. pestae Roewer, 1950, synonym of I. luteipes
 I. plicata Roewer, 1923, synonym of I. hellwigii
 I. reimoseri Roewer, 1950, synonym of I. kollari
 I. segregata Roewer, 1950, synonym of I. kollari
 I. spinichelis Roewer, 1950, synonym of I. kollari
 I. strasseri Roewer, 1950, synonym of I. kollari
 I. styriaca Roewer, 1950, synonym of I. kollari
 I. turki Roewer, 1950, synonym of I. navarrensis

According to L. Labrada and C. Prieto in Schönhofer (2013), "Establishment of the present-day taxonomy and validating species-specific characters in Ischyropsalis have been mainly facilitated by the thorough revision of Martens (1969). Having been unable to borrow many types from the Iberian Peninsula, part of his work remained hypothetical for that local fauna, which was later corrected by Dresco (e.g. 1970, 1972), Luque (1991, 1992) and Prieto (1990a, 1990b). Of the 42 species described or emended by Roewer (1914, 1916, 1923, 1950, 1953a) only two remain valid."

References

Further reading
  (eds.) (2007): Harvestmen - The Biology of Opiliones. Harvard University Press 
 

Harvestmen